Cassander was a Macedonian nobleman who lived in the 4th century BC.

Cassander was the son of Iolaus by an unnamed mother and brother of the powerful Regent and general Antipater. Cassander’s family were distant collateral relatives to the Argead dynasty. Cassander, like Antipater, was originally from the Macedonian city of Paliura and was a contemporary to Aristotle.

Little is known on his life. He married an unnamed Greek Macedonian noblewoman by whom he had a child: a daughter called Antigone who married a Greek Macedonian nobleman called Magas by whom she had a daughter called Berenice I of Egypt. His namesake was his nephew Cassander, who became king of Macedon.

References

Sources
 H.J. Rose, A new general biographical dictionary, Volume 2, T. Fellowes, 1857
 W. Heckel, Who’s who in the age of Alexander the Great: prosopography of Alexander’s empire, Wiley-Blackwell, 2006
 Ptolemaic Dynasty - Affiliated Lines: Antipatrids
 Ptolemaic Genealogy: Berenice I

4th-century BC Macedonians
4th-century BC Greek people
Antipatrid dynasty